Sociedad anónima deportiva ("Public limited sports company") is a special type of public limited company in Spain. The new legal status was introduced in 1990 to improve financial management and transparency in sports clubs. Many Spanish football and basketball clubs add the suffix S.A.D. to the end of their official name, e.g. Club Atlético de Madrid, S.A.D.

Every club which plays in Segunda División or Liga ACB and remains in the league is obliged to convert to S.A.D. status.

For historical reasons, Athletic Club, FC Barcelona, Real Madrid and Osasuna were allowed to retain their status as non-commercial sports associations.

List of clubs

Football

Basketball

See also 
 List of football clubs in Spain
 Sociedade Anónima Desportiva

References

External links
 List of SAD at CSD website
 91360.co | sport business website

Law of Spain
Sports organisations of Spain
Sports terminology
Corporate law
Legal entities
Types of business entity